Najjar Kola-ye Jadid (also Romanized as Najjār Kolā-ye Jadīd; also known as Najjār Kolā) is a village in Kiakola Rural District, in the Central District of Simorgh County, Mazandaran Province, Iran. At the 2006 census, its population was 336, in 95 families.

References 

Populated places in Simorgh County